Fortunato N. Perri (born December 15, 1936) is a former Republican member of the Pennsylvania House of Representatives.

References

Republican Party members of the Pennsylvania House of Representatives
1936 births
Living people